Shonan Maru may refer to the following ships:

 , World War II era Japanese submarine chaser
 , World War II era Japanese submarine chaser
 , Japanese fisheries vessel built in 1972

Ship names